Martin Busse (born 30 June 1958) is a retired football midfielder.

During his club career, Busse spent his entire career at FC Rot-Weiß Erfurt, making over 200 appearances for them.
He played three times for the East Germany national team, scoring one goal.

References

External links
 
 
 

1958 births
Living people
East German footballers
East Germany international footballers
Association football midfielders